Alexander Pollock (born November 17, 1989) is a Canadian realtor and former actor. He is best known for his roles as Corky in Big Bully, Scotty Brody in Cats & Dogs, and Richie/Elf Tight End in The Santa Clause 2.

Career
He made his debut in 1996 as Corky in Big Bully (film).

He appeared as Scotty Brody in Cats & Dogs (2001). Other notable appearances include The Santa Clause 2,  the 2002 TV series Taken, and the 2005 film School of Life. School of Life was Alexander's final movie. 

For his role in Cats & Dogs, he was nominated for the Young Artist Award for Best Performance in a Feature Film and Leading Young Actor.

After filming School of Life, Pollock retired from acting. Today, he is a realtor in his hometown of Vancouver, British Columbia, Canada.

Filmography
Big Bully (1996) as Corky
The Angel of Pennsylvania Avenue (1996) as Jack Feagan
The Stepsister (1997) as Brian Harrison
The Outer Limits (1997) as BoyNorthern Lights (1997 film) (1997) as BobbyCloned (film) (1997) as Timmy/ChrisFloating Away (1998) as Brat (Kyle)You Know My Name (1999) as Woody TighmanResurrection (1999) as HollisFatal Error (1999) as Grandson (as Alex Pollock)The Crow: Stairway to Heaven (1999) as Jason VincennesHayley Wagner, Star (1999) as Seth They Nest (2000) as Henry S. CrumpReplicant (2001) as Young GarrotteCats & Dogs (2001) as Scotty BrodyVideo Voyeur: The Susan Wilson Story (2001) as Orin WilsonAmerican Dreams (2002) as Kid in storeThe Santa Clause 2 (2002) as Richie/Elf Tight EndTaken (2002) as Edward Watkins Jr.A Wrinkle in Time (2003) as Eric O'KeefeSchool of Life'' (2005) as Jesse Miller

References

External links

1989 births
Canadian male child actors
Canadian male film actors
Canadian male television actors
Living people
Canadian real estate agents